Kaco may refer to:

Kaco’ language, an Austro-Asiatic language of Vietnam
Kaco (drum), a type of shamanistic drum of the Ainu people
KACO (FM), a radio station licensed to Apache, Oklahoma, United States
Lake Kaco, Lempur, Jambi, Indonesia